Étienne-Barthélémy Garnier (24 August 1759 - 16 November 1849) was a French painter of historical subjects.

Grandson of François Garnier, cabinet-maker, son of Pierre Garnier, cabinet-maker, born in Paris, he studied art under Joseph-Marie Vien. He received second prize in the Prix de Rome of 1787 and first in 1788 with a painting on the subject The Death of Tatius, beating Louis Girodet. He lived in Rome until 1793.

He was elected member of the Academy of Fine Arts in 1816. He exhibited a large number of History Paintings on classical and religious themes in the neo-classical manner. His painting Éponine et Sabinus, 1810, was exhibited at the 1810 Salon and again in 1814, when it was acquired by Louis XVIII. In 1824 he delivered the eulogy at the funeral of Girodet.

References

1759 births
1849 deaths
Prix de Rome for painting
18th-century French painters
French male painters
19th-century French painters
Painters from Paris
19th-century French male artists
18th-century French male artists